Autoclenz Ltd v Belcher [2011] UKSC 41 is a landmark UK labour law and English contract law case decided by the Supreme Court of the United Kingdom, concerning the scope of statutory protection of rights for working individuals. It confirmed the view, also taken by the Court of Appeal, that the relative bargaining power of the parties must be taken into account when deciding whether a person counts as an employee, to get employment rights. As Lord Clarke said,

Facts
Twenty car valeters, including Mr Paul Huntington and Mr Belcher, worked for Autoclenz Ltd in Measham, Derbyshire. Autoclenz Ltd had contracted with British Car Auctions Ltd (BCA) to provide valeting services. The valeters engaged by Autoclenz claimed holiday pay and pay at the rate of the national minimum wage. They had each signed contracts describing them as self-employed. Paul Huntington worked full-time from 1991 until the hearing before the Employment Tribunal (and thereafter) except for a few weeks working for a competitor in 2002 and 2003. In 2007 Autoclenz Ltd invited the valeters to sign new contracts, purportedly clarifying that they were sub-contractors and not employees, that they must provide their own cleaning materials, that there was no obligation to provide services to Autoclenz and nor did Autoclenz have any obligation to offer work to the valeters. Furthermore, there was a term that a valeter could provide a suitably qualified substitute. Autoclenz made a 5% charge for materials, and a charge for insurance.  The individuals wore the BCA logo on uniforms for security reasons. Autoclenz contended that the individuals were not 'workers' for the purposes of the statutory definitions of that term in the Working Time Regulations 1999 and the National Minimum Wage Act 1998.

Judgement

Employment Tribunal
At the Employment Tribunal, Employment Judge Foxwell held that the claimants were employees and that even if they were not, they were workers. Judge Peter Clark in the Employment Appeal Tribunal held that the claimants were not employees but that they were workers, following the decision of the Court of Appeal in Consistent Group Ltd v Kalwak.

The company appealed against the finding that the individuals were workers, and the individuals then cross-appealed against the finding that they were not employees.

Court of Appeal
Smith LJ held that the car valeters were employees despite the contract describing them as self-employed. Employers and their advisers cannot draft their way out of employment status if that does not accord with the reality of the relationship:

Aikens LJ concurred in the result, but said that he would put the point in his own words.

Sedley LJ concurred with Aikens LJ. He said,

Supreme Court
Lord Hope, Lord Walker, Lord Collins, Lord Clarke and Lord Wilson, on appeal, unanimously held that the car valeters were engaged under contracts of employment and this was not affected by the clauses which stated that they were self-employed, had no obligation to work, no right to receive work, and could substitute another worker. Lord Clarke, giving the judgment of the court, emphasised that a contract of employment was a specific kind of contract, not to be treated the same as commercial contracts, because there may be an element of inequality of bargaining power. The judgment of Rimer LJ, in Consistent Group Ltd v Kalwak, suggesting that contractual documents contained the expression of the true intentions of the parties unless there was a sham, intended to deceive third parties, was expressly doubted. Accordingly, under the valeters were employees and 'workers' as defined and were entitled both to remuneration at the rate of the national minimum wage and to paid leave.

See also

Contract of employment in English law
UK labour law
EU labour law
US labor law
German labour law
Aslam v Uber BV (2016) Case no: 2202550/2015

Notes

References
AL Bogg, 'Sham self-employment in the Court of Appeal' (2010) 126 Law Quarterly Review 166
KR Handley, 'Sham self-employment' (2011) 127 Law Quarterly Review 171
E McGaughey, A Casebook on Labour Law (Hart 2019) ch 3, 101

United Kingdom labour case law
Supreme Court of the United Kingdom cases
2011 in case law
2011 in British law
Parking